The Soltani Mosque of Borujerd is a large mosque in the centre of Borujerd, in the province of Lorestan, western Iran.

The edifice was built in the Qajar period atop the ruins of an older mosque, which had been probably built in the 10th century AD. Soltani means "related to Sultan," and likely refers to Fath Ali Shah Qajar, who ordered this building to be rebuilt.

The stone inscription on the surface of its western portico bear the date 1248 AH (1832–33 AD), and on the wooden door opening on Ja’fari Avenue, the date 1291 AH (1874–75) can be read.

The plan of the mosque is of the four-arced type, with three main entrances. The western entrance gives access to the Great Bazaar of Borujerd. The mosque's yard measures 61×47  m, and the roof arch of the southern prayer all has a height of approximately 17 m. The interior decorations of the mosque consist of tile works, stucco carving and moqarnas chiseling. The stones of the northern portico's main base are also decorated with very fine patterns.

Soltani Mosque of Borujerd was known as Masjed Shah in the Pahlavi Dynasty and today it is called Masjed-e Imam Khomeini. It is nationally registered and protected. However, it was badly damaged during the 2006 Borujerd earthquake.

See also

Jame Mosque of Borujerd
Borujerd

Gallery

External links
Borujerd.Info

Mosques in Iran
10th-century mosques
Buildings and structures in Lorestan Province
Borujerd